Acemya rufitibia is a species of bristle fly in the family Tachinidae.

Distribution
Europe, Russia.

References

Exoristinae
Diptera of Europe
Diptera of Asia
Insects described in 1840
Taxa named by Karl Ludwig Friedrich von Roser